The Occitan Wikipedia is the Occitan language version of Wikipedia.

References

External links

Occitan Wikipedia  
Occitan Wikipedia mobile version 
Interview about the Occitan Wikipedia in the online news site A Vòste 

Wikipedias by language
Wikipedia
French encyclopedias
Wikipedias in Romance languages